Mauro de Campos Júnior (23 April 1955 – 6 August 2004), known as Mauro Cabeção, is a Brazilian former footballer who played as a defender. He competed in the men's tournament at the 1976 Summer Olympics.

References

External links
 

1955 births
2004 deaths
People from Nova Odessa
Brazilian footballers
Association football defenders
Brazil international footballers
Olympic footballers of Brazil
Footballers at the 1976 Summer Olympics
Footballers from São Paulo (state)
Pan American Games medalists in football
Footballers at the 1975 Pan American Games
Pan American Games gold medalists for Brazil
Medalists at the 1975 Pan American Games